Gibberula lalaina is a species of sea snail, a marine gastropod mollusk, in the family Cystiscidae.

Description
The length of the shell attains 2.42 mm.

Distribution
This marine species occurs off Madagascar.

References

lalaina
Gastropods described in 2012